Suzanne Dantès (1888–1958) was a French stage and film actress.

Selected filmography
 The Courier of Lyon (1923)
 Black and White (1931)
 A Happy Man (1932)
 Extenuating Circumstances (1939)
 Miquette (1940)
 La Grande Meute (1945)
 The Cupid Club (1949)
 Their Last Night (1953)
 The Gambler (1958)

References

Bibliography
 Michaël Abecassis. The Representation of Parisian Speech in the Cinema of the 1930s. Peter Lang, 2005.

External links

1888 births
1958 deaths
French film actresses
French stage actresses
People from Aisne